Cui Yuan may refer to:

Cui Yuan (Han dynasty) (77–142 or 78–143), officer and scholar during the Han dynasty
Cui Yuan (705–768), Tang dynasty politician, chief councilor during the reigns of Emperor Xuanzong and Emperor Suzong
 Cui Yuan (died 905), Tang dynasty politician, chief councilor during the reigns of Emperor Zhaozong and Emperor Ai